Gabrielle Réjane, née Gabrielle Charlotte Réju (6 June 1856 – 14 June 1920), was a French actress of the late 19th and early 20th centuries.

The daughter of a former actor, Réjane studied at the Paris Conservatoire and made her stage debut in 1875. After eight seasons at the Théâtre du Vaudeville in increasingly prominent roles, she became leading lady at the Théâtre des Variétés, a position she combined with appearances in more substantial plays at other theatres. She became known chiefly for her roles in comedies, but made an impression in serious character parts from time to time. Her biggest success was as Catherine, the outspoken washerwoman who becomes a duchess in the historical comedy-drama Madame Sans-Gêne by Sardou and Moreau. She created the role in 1893 and played it frequently for much of her career. Among her other celebrated roles was Nora in Henrik Ibsen's A Doll's House in 1894, which gave the author his first success in France.

Réjane appeared in major cities throughout Europe, and was particularly popular in London, where she played frequently between 1877 and 1915. She twice played on Broadway, but did not become popular with American audiences. She married the director of the Vaudeville, and starred there, but after their divorce in 1905 she opened her own theatre, which she ran until 1918. Between 1900 and 1920 she appeared in six silent films, including two versions of Madame Sans-Gêne. She was widely regarded as the embodiment of the Parisienne, and when she died in 1920 Le Figaro said that Paris had lost its soul.

Life and career

Early years

Réjane was born in Paris on 6 June 1856. Her father, a former actor, was on the front-of-house staff of the Théâtre de l'Ambigu-Comique. He died when Réjane was about five, leaving his widow in straitened circumstances. She obtained a post at another Parisian theatre, and the young Réjane painted fans to augment the family income. In 1870–71 her education, at the Pension Boulet, was interrupted by the Siege of Paris and the bloody events of the Commune. After the fighting ended she returned to her studies and was appointed as a paid assistant to look after the younger pupils.

Réjane had ambitions to go on the stage, and, having obtained a reluctant consent from her mother, she successfully applied to François-Joseph Regnier, a distinguished actor and teacher, for admission to his class at the Paris Conservatoire. In 1874 she won the Conservatoire's deuxième prix (second prize) for comedy. The critic Francisque Sarcey held that she deserved the premier prix, but "A first prize carries with it the right of entrance into the Comédie-Française, and the jury did not think Mademoiselle Réjane, with her little wide-awake face, suited to the vast frame of the House of Molière".

According to the official regulations, Réjane, as a winner of the deuxième prix, was required to join the company of France's second national theatre, the Odéon, but she preferred the repertoire and better pay at the Théâtre du Vaudeville, and the Odéon management did not press the point. She made her debut at the Vaudeville in 1875 in the prologue to the Revue des deux-mondes, by Clairville, making an immediate impression. A reviewer commented, "She has the arch and sprightly air of a Parisian grisette, a flexible voice of an agreeable tone, and perfect self-possession – qualities more than sufficient to succeed on the stage". Later in the year she had her first substantial success, as Niquette in the comedy Fanny Lear by Henri Meilhac and Ludovic Halévy. She remained at the Vaudeville for eight seasons, attracting good notices. The established star at the theatre, Julia Bartet, had the lion's share of leading roles, but Réjane made her mark. The critic Dauphin Meunier later wrote:

In 1877 Réjane made the first of many appearances in London. Parisian theatres customarily closed for a few weeks during the height of summer, and in July, with Vaudeville colleagues, she played at the Gaiety Theatre in the West End in the comedies Perfide comme l'onde, Nos alliées and Aux crochets d'un gendre. The Athenaeum applauded "a display of vivacity and espièglerie quite exceptional on the part of Mdlle Réjane", and The Morning Post found her "infinitely diverting".

Variétés and stardom

In 1882, the year after the retirement of Hortense Schneider, star of the Théâtre des Variétés, Réjane was engaged as leading lady there. Her contract at the Variétés allowed her to appear in more serious roles in other theatres, and in 1883 Sarah Bernhardt, who was then running the Ambigu, cast her in the central role of Jean Richepin's La Glu; in that part, and as Adrienne de Boistulbé in Meilhac's Ma camarade at the Théâtre du Palais-Royal in the same year, Réjane attracted highly favourable critical attention.

Over the next ten years Réjane appeared at six or more Paris theatres, in an exceptionally wide variety of plays, from new works by Edmond Gondinet (Clara Soleil, 1885), Meilhac (Les demoiselles Clochart, 1886, and Ma cousine, 1890), Victorien Sardou (Marquise, 1889) and Edmond Haraucourt (Shylock, 1889), to revivals of classics by Beaumarchais (Le mariage de Figaro, 1889), Dumas (La Demi-Monde, 1890) and Aristophanes (Lysistrata, 1892). She continually showed the range of her abilities as an actress: in 1887 in Allô-Allô she played a scene grappling with the difficulties of the new-fangled telephone, which, Meunier recalled, was so funny "that from the gallery to the stalls the theatre was one roar of laughter and applause". In the following year she appeared at the Odéon in a stage adaptation of Germinie Lacerteux by the Goncourt brothers. The actor and director André Antoine described her performance:

Among those who saw the performance was Marcel Proust who became a devoted admirer, and later friend; his character Berma, the great actress in À la recherche du temps perdu, is partly based on Réjane.

In 1893 Réjane married Paul Porel, director of the Vaudeville; they had two children – Germaine and Jacques. She appeared at the Vaudeville in a series of successful plays; two of the earliest productions demonstrated her range. In October 1893 she created the role with which she was most closely associated during the rest of her career: Catherine, the outspoken washerwoman-duchess in Sardou and Moreau's historical comedy-drama Madame Sans-Gêne. The critical and public response was enthusiastic. In Le Figaro, Henry Fouquier judged that Réjane had turned an artificial character into something delicious, feminine and overwhelming. Another reviewer wrote:

Six months later Réjane played Nora in the French premiere of Henrik Ibsen's A Doll's House ("Une maison de poupée"). Ibsen had never succeeded with Parisian audiences until now, but to his delight the production was a triumph. Les annales du théâtre et de la musique recorded, "Nora's role is overwhelming; Mademoiselle Réjane took the opportunity of one of the greatest successes of her career. She was able to highlight the very complex character of the role, and with a rare simplicity of means she demonstrated in the famous tarantella scene an admirable dramatic power. Needless to say, it was acclaimed". Another contemporary critic wrote:

London and New York

In 1894 Réjane returned to the West End. Since her first appearance there, in 1877, she had been in a production of Alphonse Daudet's Le Nabab at the Gaiety in 1883. Her reviews then had been good, but her return in June 1894 in Madame Sans-Gêne prompted superlatives from the critics and drew full houses, even with the counter-attraction of a Bernhardt season at Daly's Theatre. Réjane's season had to be extended by a fortnight to meet demand.

In February 1895 Réjane opened at Abbey's Theatre in New York for a season comprising Madame Sans-Gêne, Divorçons, Sapho, Ma cousine and A Doll's House. Reviews for Réjane were excellent, but less so for the plays, and audiences were unresponsive: as an American commentator put it, "The language was, of course, one stumbling block, for a keen understanding of the foreign tongue was more necessary for a taste for Réjane than for the broad effects, say, of a Bernhardt". Among those in the audience who understood the words there was a substantial section whose broadness of mind did not extend to the content of French plays. The New York Times later commented that Réjane was "hampered by the moral bias of American audiences".

Réjane was so disgusted at the lack of appreciation that she vowed never to return. She took her company back to Paris via London, where they played a season of most of the same plays to full houses at the Garrick Theatre. Madame Sans-Gêne was once again an immense success, and Sir Henry Irving negotiated the rights to stage an English version, which he produced at the Lyceum Theatre with Ellen Terry in Réjane's role two years later.

Réjane eventually relented and agreed to return to the US, but not until 1904, by which time she had been seen by audiences in Belgium, Denmark, the Netherlands, Germany, Russia, Austria, Romania, Italy, Spain and Portugal. In the meanwhile, at home her marriage was disintegrating, and in 1905 she and Porel were divorced. The children remained with her. The Vaudeville, under Porel's management, being now closed to her, Réjane decided to go into management on her own account.

Théâtre Réjane and later years

Réjane was not long without a theatrical base. In 1906 the writer Arnold Bennett, then resident in Paris, wrote:

At the Théâtre Réjane its proprietor appeared in twenty new plays and revivals by playwrights ranging from the grandiose Catulle Mendès to the chic Sacha Guitry between 1906 and 1910 – "none of them, perhaps, a new Sans-Gêne or Marquise", according to her biographer Forrest Izzard, "but each serving to keep in vigorous use one of the rarest talents of the time". Réjane did not appear in every production at her theatre; she was not in the cast of the French premiere of Maurice Maeterlinck's play The Blue Bird ("L'oiseau bleu"), given at the Théâtre Réjane in March 1911. Nor did she confine her appearances in Paris to her own theatre; in 1911 and 1916 she appeared at the Théâtre de la Porte Saint-Martin in Henry Bataille's L'enfant de l'amour and L'amazone.

As well as her base in Paris, Réjane hoped to found a French repertory theatre in London. A first step was made in 1906 with a season at the Royalty Theatre, but the plan was not taken further. Réjane sold her Paris theatre in 1918, after which its name was changed to the Théâtre de Paris.

Réjane took part in six silent films. Two were versions of Madame Sans-Gêne, the first directed by Clément Maurice, 1900, and the second by André Calmettes, 1911. The others were Britannicus (Calmettes, 1908), L'Assomoir (Albert Capellani, 1909), Alsace (Henri Pouctal, 1916) and Miarka (Louis Mercanton, 1920).

During the First World War, Réjane devoted much effort to helping the Allied cause, and she appeared at the Royal Court Theatre, London, in a patriotic drama called Alsace, and at the London Coliseum in a war-play entitled The Bet. She was made a Chevalier of the Legion of Honour, an event celebrated in February 1920 by a luncheon at the Théâtre de Paris, presided over by President-elect Paul Deschanel.

Réjane died of influenza in Paris on 14 June 1920, aged 64. The following day the front page of Le Figaro bore the words, "Réjane est morte... Du silence, messieurs et mesdames du Paris de 1920, un peu de silence. Et pour nous, des larmes. Nous perdons l'âme de Paris". – Réjane is dead. ... Silence, gentlemen and ladies of Paris, 1920, a little silence. And for us, tears. We lose the soul of Paris".

Gallery

Notes, references and sources

Notes

References

Sources

External links

 Madame Sans-Géne About the play and Gabrielle Rejane, with an 1894 review from PUNCH magazine(Wayback Machine)

portrait of Rejane and her daughter Germaine(Wayback Machine)

1856 births
1920 deaths
Actresses from Paris
Burials at Passy Cemetery
French stage actresses
French film actresses
French silent film actresses
20th-century French actresses
19th-century French actresses